Rabus is a German language surname. Notable people with the name include:
 Carl Rabus (1898–1983), German expressionist artist and painter
 Karl Rabus (1800–1857), Russian architectural painter and art teacher
 Ludwig Rabus (1523–592), German Lutheran theologian and Protestant reformer

References 

German-language surnames